The Basses Choice/Days Point Archeological District is a large area (more than ) of coastal Isle of Wight County, Virginia, that is of archaeological interest.  It is located in the area between the Pagan River and the James River, north of Smithfield.  The point of land at the confluence of the two rivers has been known as Day's Point since Virginia was settled by English colonists in the 17th century.  Land on the point was granted to Captain John Day, and the area was known as Warrosquyoake Shire before it was renamed Isle of Wight County.  In 1621 Nathaniel Basse was granted land that bordered Pagan Bay.  Basse settled colonists on this land in 1622. His house was burned in the Great Massacre of 1622, when a significant number of settlers in Warrosquyoake were killed by Native Americans. Basse's settlement was rebuilt, and he was reported as owning  in 1625.

The district was listed on the National Register of Historic Places in 1983.

See also
National Register of Historic Places listings in Isle of Wight County, Virginia

References

Sources

Archaeological sites on the National Register of Historic Places in Virginia
National Register of Historic Places in Isle of Wight County, Virginia
Historic districts on the National Register of Historic Places in Virginia